The Our Lady of Fatima Cathedral or simply Cathedral of Benguela is a religious building of the Catholic Church which is in Benguela, in the African country of Angola and serves as the cathedral of the Diocese of Benguela.

The church of Our Lady of Fatima has replaced the old church of the same name in 1963 and was elevated to the status of cathedral diocese in 1970. The construction was supervised by Pastor Teixeira Neves, with the design of Mario de Oliveira, inspired in the cathedral of Sumbe. The church is the largest in the city parish and is a rectangular concrete building floor, covered with a steep roof.

See also
 Roman Catholic Diocese of Benguela
 Roman Catholicism in Angola
 Our Lady of Fatima Church

References

Roman Catholic cathedrals in Angola
Buildings and structures in Benguela
Roman Catholic churches completed in 1963
20th-century Roman Catholic church buildings